Pearl Moore (born March 16, 1957) is a retired American professional basketball player who played for the Women's Professional Basketball League. During her collegiate career at Francis Marion University, Moore established herself as one of the most prolific scorers in college history, male or female, and is the all-time career-scoring leader in women's college basketball. In 1979, she began her WBL career, playing with the New York Stars, then, the following season, Moore joined the St. Louis Streak. Moore was inducted into the Women's Basketball Hall of Fame in 2021.

Biography

Born in Florence, South Carolina, Moore began playing basketball while attending Wilson High School where she was in the starting line-up for all four years, and achieved early success, earning the MVP award at the 1975 and 1976 AAU Junior Olympic Games. Moore, who commenced her collegiate career with Anderson Junior College for one semester (where she amassed 177 points in eight games), transferred to Francis Marion University, and, because of AIAW rules, she was immediately eligible to play the remainder of the 1975–76 season for the campus's team, the Patriots. Patriots head coach Sylvia Hatchell reflected on Moore's unique ability to score: "She was outside, inside, she could handle the ball, draw fouls. I saw her wait for the defense to catch up with her so she could draw the foul and make a 3-point play. She was ahead of her time".

During her junior year, Moore posted a then single-game record 60 points in a victory over Eastern Washington State College in the 1978 AIAW Small College National Tournament. On March 10, 1979, in her final collegiate game, Moore scored 42 points against the University of Tennessee at Chattanooga to break the previous all-time record of 4,045 career points, previously set by Travis Grant of Kentucky State University. Overall, Moore averaged 30.6 points per game during her stint at Francis Marion, scored a total of 4,061 points in an era where the three-point arc was not incorporated into women's basketball, and helped lead the Patriots to three national championship appearances. Throughout her career with Francis Marion, Moore always scored in double-figures, and posted less than 20 points in only 18 of her total 128 games, which both testify to her dominance offensively.

Moore graduated from Francis Marion in 1979 with a Bachelor of Science degree in sociology. She was subsequently selected in the first round by the New York Stars in the Women's Professional Basketball League draft. In her first professional season, the Stars concluded their regular schedule with the highest winning-percentage in the league. Despite a 36-point game from "Machine Gun" Molly Bolin of the Iowa Cornets, the Stars won the championship series behind a 27-point effort by Moore.  She played another season, joining the St. Louis Streak, and participated in the 1981 WBL All-Star Game. When the WBL folded, Moore played the final season of her professional career with the Foreign Pro League of Venezuela.

Following her pro career, Moore coached high-school teams. She has received recognition for her accomplishments in women's basketball with her induction into the FMU Athletic Hall of Fame in 1992 and the Women's Hall of Fame in 2011. Michael Hawkins, who nominated Moore for the latter honor, called her one of college basketball's most prolific scorers and the best player Francis Marion ever produced. Moore currently hosts her own girls' basketball camp.

In May 2021, Moore was selected to be inducted into the Naismith Memorial Basketball Hall of Fame in its 2021 class.

References

1957 births
Living people
American expatriate basketball people in Venezuela
American women's basketball players
Basketball players from South Carolina
College women's basketball players in the United States
Francis Marion University alumni
Junior college women's basketball players in the United States
Sportspeople from Florence, South Carolina
Women's Professional Basketball League players